Gelechia muscosella, the grey sallow groundling, is a moth of the family Gelechiidae. It is found in Europe (except the Mediterranean region). It is also found in the Caucasus, Siberia and the Russian Far East.

The wingspan is 14–18 mm.

References

Moths described in 1839
Gelechia
Moths of Europe